Rusevski is a Macedonian surname. Notable people with the surname include:

Ace Rusevski (born 1956), Macedonian boxer
Predrag Rusevski (born 1983), Macedonian tennis player

Macedonian-language surnames